South Bank is a station on the Overbrook branch of the Port Authority of Allegheny County's light rail network. It is located in the Overbrook neighborhood of Pittsburgh, Pennsylvania. The station is a major transit facility, serving as not only a light rail stop but also as a bus stop along the South Busway, a bus rapid transit route. The station is also designed to serve the crowded and mostly residential community that surrounds the site.

History
South Bank was opened in 1977, as a stop on the then-new South Busway, which served as the final connection point to the Overbrook line before reaching South Hills Junction, since the streetcar line left the busway at this point and crossed Route 51.  In 1993, the Overbrook line was suspended, and the stop became a bus-only stop.  Rail service returned when the Overbrook line was rebuilt in 2004, and was the only stop on the once shared portion of the busway to return as a rail-busway connection point.

Connecting bus services
Y1 Large Flyer
Y45 Baldwin Manor Flyer
Y46 Elizabeth Flyer
Y47 Curry Flyer
Y49 Prospect Park Flyer

References

External links

Port Authority T Station listings

Port Authority of Allegheny County stations
Railway stations in the United States opened in 1977
Blue Line (Pittsburgh)
Silver Line (Pittsburgh)
South Busway